Gordon Grisenthwaite is a Nlaka'pamux writer from Canada, whose debut novel Home Waltz was a shortlisted finalist for the Governor General's Award for English-language fiction at the 2021 Governor General's Awards.

A member of the Lytton First Nation, Grisenthwaite worked as a graphic designer in Vancouver and Kelowna, before completing his master's in English literature and creative writing at the University of Windsor in the late 2010s. He has published short stories and poetry in various Canadian literary magazines including The Antigonish Review and Prism International; his short story "The Fine Art of Frying Eggs" was the winner of the John Kenneth Galbraith Literary Award in 2013, and his short story "Splatter Patterns" was shortlisted for the 2021 CBC Short Story Prize.

References

External links
 

21st-century Canadian novelists
21st-century Canadian poets
21st-century Canadian short story writers
21st-century Canadian male writers
21st-century First Nations writers
Canadian male novelists
Canadian graphic designers
First Nations novelists
First Nations poets
Artists from British Columbia
Writers from British Columbia
Nlaka'pamux people
Living people
University of Windsor alumni
Year of birth missing (living people)